"Just Another Dream" is a song by English singer-songwriter Cathy Dennis, first released in the UK & continental Europe as her solo debut single in 1989. In 1990–1991 it was remixed and included on Dennis' first album, Move to This (1990), and re-released as a single, becoming a top 10 Hit in the US. The song was co-written by Dancin' Danny D (real name Daniel Kojo Poku), a.k.a. D Mob, who also produced the track and sang backing vocals. Poku's vocals are often mistaken for Rick Astley.

Chart performance
When "Just Another Dream" was first released in 1989, it charted on the UK Singles Chart for 2 weeks in December 1989, peaking at number 93. In 1990, the song was remixed by Shep Pettibone (credit for the mix is shared with Dancin' Danny D) and released in July of that year on Dennis' album Move to This.

In September 1990, a shortened edit of the album remix was released as a single in the United States. It reached the Billboard Hot 100 in January 1991, peaking at number 9 on 2 February 1991. It also peaked at number 2 for three weeks on the Billboard dance charts.

"Just Another Dream" was then released in the UK again in July 1991, with the same version and artwork as the US single release. This time it received substantial radio airplay and peaked at number 13, remaining on the chart for 7 weeks.

Critical reception
Alex Henderson of AllMusic named the song one of the high points of Move to This. Larry Flick from Billboard wrote, "Singer who enlivened D-Mob's pop hit "C'mon and Get My Love" steps into the solo spotlight with this disco-styled house cut, which has already received clubland kudos as an import. Guided by D-Mob mastermind Dancin' Danny D, Dennis' star power is undeniable as she romps through the tune with unabashed charm and confidence. Sounds like a multiformat smash." 

Elysa Gardner from Entertainment Weekly felt that its "percolating" production "is the real star here". A reviewer from Music & Media described it as "quality commercial dance-pop. The groove stands tall while the sweet melodic pop melody seems just right for Dennis's fresh girl-next-door vocals. Kylie in clubland." John Mackie from The Vancouver Sun found that the singer "injects a little bit of soul into the mix, soul that lifts songs like "Just Another Dream", "Too Many Walls" and "My Beating Heart" high above the standards set by most modern dance music."

Music video
Two music videos were produced for the different releases. The first was directed by Russell Young and released in 1990. The second was directed by Gregg Masuak and released in 1991.

Track listings
 UK CD single (first release)
 "Just Another Dream" (Danny D 7-inch edit)
 "Just Another Dream" (Funky Love mix)
 "Just Another Dream" (Paul Simpson US remix)

 US CD single
 "Just Another Dream" (7-inch)
 "Just Another Dream" (club mix)
 "Just Another Dream" (The Dream mix)
 "Just Another Dream" (Paul Simpson US remix)
 "Just Another Dream" (Funky Love mix)

 UK CD single (second release)
 "Just Another Dream" (12-inch version)
 "Just Another Dream" (7-inch mix)
 "Just Another Dream" (alternative bass dub version)

Charts

Weekly charts

Year-end charts

References

1989 debut singles
1989 songs
1990 singles
1991 singles
Cathy Dennis songs
Polydor Records singles
Songs written by Cathy Dennis
Songs written by D Mob